Ammiel Issaschar Bushakevitz (born 9 April 1986 in Jerusalem) is an Israeli-South African pianist.

Early life
Ammiel Bushakevitz moved at a young age with his family from Jerusalem, Israel to George, Western Cape.

Bushakevitz studied at the Conservatoire national supérieur de musique et de danse de Paris in Paris, France and the Hochschule für Musik und Theater Felix Mendelssohn Bartholdy in Leipzig, Germany.

Awards and fellowships
He has been awarded the Deutscher Akademischer Austauschdienst's International Scholarship for Artists, European Commission Award, French-German Forum for Young Artists Award, HMT Freundeskreis Scholarship, Ad-Infinitum-Stiftung Award, Oppenheimer Memorial Trust Scholarship, Bill Venter/FAK Bursary, Pretorium Trust Postgraduate Bursary, FAK Senior Music Award, PJ Lemmer Scholarship, Southern African Music Rights Organisation SAMRO Undergraduate Bursary, Isaac Greenberg Scholarship for Jewish Students, Du Toit/Van Tonder Award, Gladwell Scholarship, Gideon Roos/Esther Mentz Award, UP General Study Scholarship, Stellenbosch Vrouevereniging Award and Brenda Rein Scholarship. In 2014 Ammiel Bushakevitz was named Edison Fellow of the British Library, London.

Discography

 2017 - Franz Schubert: Impromptus & Klavierstücke  Solo Piano album (Hänssler Classic)
 2017 - Liszt: 15 Songs  Liszt: 15 Songs, Timothy Fallon, tenor, Ammiel Bushakevitz, piano. Recorded at the (Jerusalem Music Centre), Israel.  (BIS Records)
 2017 - Fries: Sisi Poems - Lieder der Kaiserin Elisabeth  Nina Bernsteiner, mezzo-soprano, Ammiel Bushakevitz. Vienna, Austria. (Gramola)
 2016 - Lieder aus der Jugendstil. Thuille, Wolf, Pfitzner, Mahler, Marx, Zemlinsky  Hagar Sharvit, mezzo-soprano; Ammiel Bushakevitz, piano. Recorded in Mürzzuschlag, Austria. 
 2015 - Mozart - Sonatas for piano and violin   Avigail Bushakevitz, piano; Ammiel Bushakevitz, violin. Recorded in Capellades, Spain (Solfa Records)
 2014 - Duo Aurelius live in Catalonia. Mozart, Szymanowski, Beethoven, Tahberer   Deniz Tahberer, violin; Ammiel Bushakevitz, piano.  (Solfa Records)
 2013 - Ammiel Bushakevitz plays Schubert  Ammiel Bushakevitz, piano. Recorded in Paris, France. (IAWS)

See also 
 List of classical pianists
 List of classical pianists (recorded)

References

External links 

 Discogs Discography
 Official Website
 IMDb Profile
 
 Website of Management Agency
 Ammiel Bushakevitz on Spotify
 Ammiel Bushakevitz on Apple Music - iTunes

Living people
University of Pretoria alumni
Israeli classical pianists
People from Jerusalem
1986 births
Conservatoire de Paris alumni
Israeli emigrants to South Africa
South African classical pianists
University of Music and Theatre Leipzig alumni